Kerem Atakan Kesgin (born 5 November 2000) is a Turkish footballer who plays as a midfielder for Beşiktaş.

Career
Kesgin is a youth product of Gençlerbirliğispor and Bucaspor, and began his career with the latter in the TFF Second League in 2017. He transferred to Göztepe in January 2018, where he made his debut in the Süper Lig. He transferred to Sivasspor on 30 August 2021, signing a 3 year contract. He helped Sivasspor win the 2021–22 Turkish Cup, coming on as an extra-time substitute coming on the 124th minute.

Beşiktaş
On 23 August 2022, Kesgin joined Beşiktaş.

International career
Kesgin represented Turkey at the 2017 FIFA U-17 World Cup, scoring in a 1-3 defeat by Paraguay.

Career statistics

Club

Notes

Honours
Sivasspor
 Turkish Cup: 2021–22

References

External links
 
 Kerem Kesgin at FIFA

2000 births
Living people
Turkish footballers
Turkey youth international footballers
Association football midfielders
Bucaspor footballers
Göztepe S.K. footballers
Sivasspor footballers
Beşiktaş J.K. footballers
Süper Lig players
TFF First League players
TFF Second League players
Turkey under-21 international footballers